Collins John (born 17 October 1985) is a professional footballer who plays as a forward for Buitenboys. Born in Liberia, he has represented the Netherlands national team.

John notably played in the Premier League for Fulham where he notched up 23 goals in 111 appearances, in all competitions, in a five-year stay at Craven Cottage. He also played in the English football league for Leicester City, Watford, and Barnet, in the Eredivisie for FC Twente and NEC Nijmegen, in Belgium for K.S.V. Roeselare, the United States for Chicago Fire, Azerbaijan for Gabala FC and in Iran for Mes Sarcheshmeh F.C.

Career

Club
John started his professional career at Dutch first division side FC Twente as a 17-year-old, going on to score 11 league goals during one-and-a-half seasons combined. He was signed by Fulham on 31 January 2004, cited by manager Chris Coleman as a way to expand attacking options in the future. He signed for a fee thought to be in the region of £600,000 where he was introduced at Loftus Road by John Collins, his reverse namesake. His debut for the club came as a substitute for Mark Pembridge against Chelsea in a 2–1 defeat at Stamford Bridge on 20 March.

Following an auspicious start, John scored 11 league goals in 2005–06, despite only starting 15 of the 37 in which he appeared. With a further two goals in other competitions, he was Fulham's top goalscorer that season. A goal against Middlesbrough on 20 November 2005, a volley from his weaker foot, was later to be named "Goal of the Month" by the BBC, and was in the running for "Goal of the Season".

John started six of the first seven Premiership games of 2006–07, but then lost his place and started only three more times in 2006. Coming on as a second-half substitute, and having had two goals disallowed earlier in the match, he scored his twentieth league goal at Manchester City, in November 2006.

John signed for Leicester City on 23 October 2007 on a three-month loan deal. He made his debut in a 1–0 defeat to Sheffield United a few hours later, and scored his first league goal in a 2–0 win over Barnsley on 27 October.

John scored his last goal against Colchester United six days later, in a 1–1 away draw. He returned to Fulham after making a total of eleven league appearances for Leicester.

On 25 January 2008, John joined Watford on a loan deal until the end of the 2007–08 season, with the option of a permanent move after that. He struggled with his fitness during his time at the club, making only three starts and two substitute appearances. In April 2008 he returned to Fulham after tearing a thigh muscle.

On the 2008 transfer deadline day, John moved to NEC Nijmegen on a one-year loan deal, with the Dutch side also obtaining a transfer option. In Nijmegen John suffered with continual problems. Although he was important as a substitute in two UEFA Cup matches, he failed to make an impression in the Dutch league. In January 2009 he went on trial at Charlton Athletic but wasn't offered a contract. Back in Nijmegen he was suspended to the reserve squad by manager Mario Been. On 3 March John returned to Fulham after both NEC and John didn't see any reason for continuing the loan. In March, John requested to train with Dutch side Heracles Almelo, alongside his brother Paddy, till the end of the 2008–09 season. The request was denied because John had no intention to play for Heracles in the next season.

He chose to sign for Belgian Pro League side Roeselare signing a 2-year contract. On 3 December, John was suspended and demoted to the reserve squad for disciplinary reasons by manager Dennis van Wijk. On 14 December Roeselare terminated John's contract.

John joined Major League Soccer club Chicago Fire during their pre-season training camp on 29 January 2010 with a view to signing before the start of the 2010 MLS season. On 11 March 2010, Chicago Fire hired him on a free transfer. After a disappointing season in MLS, John was released by Chicago on 24 November 2010.

John joined Gabala FC in Azerbaijan on 25 January 2011. After failing to revive his career in Azerbaijan, John handed in a transfer request. John went on trial with Nottingham Forest and flew to Portugal with them for a pre-season break.

He signed a one-year contract with Iran Pro League side Mes Sarcheshmeh on 20 December 2011. In the summer of 2012, John agreed to sign for Gençlik Gücü S.K. in Northern Cyprus, but the transfer fell through. On 22 September 2012, John joined League Two side Barnet.
 On 12 October 2012 John was joined at the club by fellow former Dutch international Edgar Davids. John made his debut against Plymouth Argyle, but was substituted after just 15 minutes due to a thigh injury. He also played in the FA Cup against Oxford United, but he was to make only two appearances for the club, and after a string of injuries, had his contract terminated by mutual consent in January 2013.

On 25 June 2013 John joined Eredivisie side Go Ahead Eagles on trial. After failing to win a contract with Go Ahead Eagles, John held talks with Polish Ekstraklasa side Piast Gliwice, and later claimed on Twitter that he had signed a two-year deal, but in fact was only training with the club until he had proven his fitness. He eventually made his debut in the Ekstraklasa on 1 September against Śląsk Wrocław as an 82nd-minute substitute.

In March 2014 it was announced the John had signed for the Pittsburgh Riverhounds of the USL Pro, the third division of the United States soccer pyramid. John debuted for the club in their second matchday of the season against the Richmond Kickers on 5 April 2014.  After coming on as a 65th-minute substitute for Jason Johnson, John scored his first goal for the club in his debut, the Riverhounds' only goal in the 1–3 defeat. In the Riverhounds' next match, John scored again during his first game at Highmark Stadium against Wilmington Hammerheads FC, for a total of two goals in two matches. Following that match, John was suspended for three matches for "violent conduct". After making thirteen appearances and scoring four goals for the Riverhounds, John and the club mutually terminated the player's contract in July 2014, citing John's desire to return his family to Europe.

John joined Crawley Town on trial in July 2014, scoring in a friendly against Brighton & Hove Albion.

From the 2016–17 season, John coached the under-19 team of SC Buitenboys. He joined their first team as a player in mid-2019, competing in the Derde Klasse.

International
John was part of the Netherlands under-21 squad that won the 2006 European Championship in Portugal.

Previously, he had already made his main team debuts, appearing in a 2–2 friendly match against Sweden, on 18 August 2004. He then made his second appearance for the Netherlands when they played in a friendly match against Liechtenstein.

Club statistics

Personal life
John was born in Zwedru, Liberia, but his family emigrated to the Netherlands after the murder of his father, during the Liberian Civil War.

His two brothers Paddy and Ola are also footballers.

Honours
Netherlands U21:
UEFA U-21 Championship: 2006

References

External links
 
 
 
 Holland stats at OnsOranje

1985 births
Living people
Liberian emigrants to the Netherlands
Association football forwards
Dutch footballers
Netherlands youth international footballers
Netherlands under-21 international footballers
Netherlands international footballers
Liberian footballers
Dutch people of Liberian descent
Sportspeople of Liberian descent
Dutch expatriate footballers
Expatriate footballers in England
Expatriate footballers in Belgium
Expatriate soccer players in the United States
Expatriate footballers in Azerbaijan
Expatriate footballers in Iran
Expatriate footballers in Poland
FC Twente players
Fulham F.C. players
Leicester City F.C. players
Watford F.C. players
Barnet F.C. players
NEC Nijmegen players
K.S.V. Roeselare players
Chicago Fire FC players
Gabala FC players
Mes Sarcheshme players
Piast Gliwice players
Pittsburgh Riverhounds SC players
Eredivisie players
Premier League players
English Football League players
Belgian Pro League players
Major League Soccer players
Ekstraklasa players
People from Grand Gedeh County